The Charli Live Tour was a concert tour by British recording artist Charli XCX in support of her third studio album Charli (2019). The tour was announced alongside the album's official reveal on June 13, 2019. The tour started on September 20, 2019 in Atlanta, United States and concluded on October 21, 2020 in Mexico City, Mexico.

Set list

 "Next Level Charli"
 "Click"
 "I Don't Wanna Know"
"Vroom Vroom"
"Gone"
"Warm"
"Cross You Out"
"February 2017"
"Thoughts"
"White Mercedes"
"Official"
"Shake It"
"I Got It"
"Track 10" / "Blame It on Your Love"
"Silver Cross"
"2099"
Encore
 "Unlock It"
 "I Love It"
 "Boys"
 "1999"

Tour dates

Cancelled shows

Notes

References

2019 concert tours
2020 concert tours
Charli XCX concert tours
Concert tours cancelled due to the COVID-19 pandemic